Cecilioides connollyi is a species of land snail in the family Ferussaciidae. It is endemic to Gibraltar.

References

Fauna of Gibraltar
Ferussaciidae
Taxonomy articles created by Polbot